The Yunnan Open was a golf tournament on the Challenge Tour, the China Tour and the PGA Tour China, held 2018 at the Kunming Yulongwan Golf Club in Yunnan Province, China. The tournament was co-sanctioned by the PGA Tour China and one of three events held in China on the 2018 Challenge Tour, along with the Hainan Open and the Foshan Open.

Winners

Notes

References

External links
Coverage on the Challenge Tour's official site

Former Challenge Tour events
Golf tournaments in China
Sport in Yunnan